Cheers originally aired on NBC from September 30, 1982 to May 20, 1993. Over the series run, 275 original episodes aired, an average of 25 episodes per season. In the early 1990s, 20 volumes of VHS cassettes were released; each had three half-hour episodes. The whole series is currently available on multi-disc sets on DVD, two to four per season. The series is also available on iTunes and Amazon Prime Video.

Series overview

Episodes

Season 1 (1982–83)
(Note: DVD Season 1 Disc 1 of the box-set episodes are out of sequence.  The  following is the correct airing order)

Season 2 (1983–84)

Season 3 (1984–85)

Season 4 (1985–86)

Season 5 (1986–87)

Season 6 (1987–88)

Season 7 (1988–89)

Season 8 (1989–90)

Season 9 (1990–91)

Season 10 (1991–92)

Season 11 (1992–93)

Notes

References

Ratings notes 
 Season 1
According to Los Angeles Times, ratings from 1982 to 1983 were based on 83.3 million households with at least one television set. "Television Ratings" column list is located at Part VI, "Calendar" section. Below sources originated from Los Angeles Times, republished in microfilm copies, which may be located in your local library.

Season 2
Except where noted, they were originally published in print editions of The Miami Herald newspaper.

Season 3
According to Los Angeles Times, Nielsen ratings of 1984–85 were based on 84.9 million households.

Season 4
According to the Daily Breeze, a newspaper from Torrance, California, the 1985–86 ratings are based on 85.9 million households with at least one television.

Season 5
According to the 15 May 1987 article from The Argus-Press, the 1986-87 ratings were based on 87.4 million households with at least one television set. Unless otherwise, the sources were of the newspaper Pittsburgh Post-Gazette.

Season 6
Unless otherwise, the main source of Nielsen ratings is the newspaper Pittsburgh Post-Gazette. According to that main source, ratings of 1987-88 were based on 88.6 million households that have at least one television.

Season 7
Unless otherwise, the main source of Nielsen ratings is the newspaper Pittsburgh Post-Gazette. According to that main source, ratings of 1988-89 were based on 90.4 million households that have at least one television.

Season 8
According to many newspapers, including the main source USA Today, the 1989–90 Nielsen ratings are based on 92.1 million households that have at least one television.

External links
 
 

 
Lists of American sitcom episodes

it:Episodi di Cin cin (prima stagione)